The Royal Canadian Naval Air Service (RCNAS) was established in 1918 during the First World War in response to a Royal Canadian Navy (RCN) recommendation that defensive air patrols be established off Canada's Atlantic coast to protect shipping from German U-boats.

Britain warned Canada that an attack by a new class of U-boat that could voyage across the Atlantic was possible. Although U-boats were few in number and not yet capable of posing a major threat in open ocean where ships were difficult to locate, they could be a threat near ports, bays or channels where ships would be certain to be grouped together. Aircraft had proven themselves in similar defensive situations such as convoys, where aircraft forced submarines to remain submerged. The United States already had aircraft and bases to defend its own shores, but it was concluded that additional stations in Canada would be needed.

The United States supplied aircraft and personnel while Canada recruited and trained its own aircrew and support personnel who were intended to replace the Americans. RCNAS aircrew were trained in the United States and the United Kingdom.

The United States Naval Flying Corps flew convoy escort missions and reconnaissance patrols from two air stations which were established in Nova Scotia near convoy assembly ports:

 Naval Air Station Halifax, Dartmouth, Nova Scotia
 Naval Air Station Sydney, North Sydney, Nova Scotia

Escorts were provided to ships leaving and entering port. No U-boats were ever located, however, although 110,000 tons of shipping were sunk in North American waters in the last two months of the war.

The war ended before the RCNAS aircrew had completed training and the RCNAS was disbanded. The Air Board took control of both stations. The Halifax station would remain in operation, while the North Sydney station was left inactive until the Second World War.

Several Canadian Naval Air Service pilots were loaned to the Royal Navy and few from British aircraft carriers. Lieutenant Robert Hampton Gray was awarded the Victoria Cross for his action when he died just five days before the war ended. The RCN would independently operate aircraft until 1968, when its aviation operations were subsumed into the Canadian Armed Forces upon unification.

See also 
 History of the Royal Canadian Air Force
 History of the Royal Canadian Navy
 History of aviation in Canada
 Royal Naval Air Service
 Canadian Aviation Corps
 Canadian Air Force (1918–20)
 Royal Flying Corps Canada

Notes

References 

 Greenhous, Brereton; Halliday, Hugh A. Canada's Air Forces, 1914–1999. Montreal: Editions Art Global and the Department of National Defence, 1999. .
 Kealy, J.D.F., and Russell, E.C. A History of Canadian Naval Aviation, 1918–1962. Ottawa: Queen's Printer, 1965. Retrieved April 24, 2010
 Kealy, J.D.F., et Russell, E.C. Histoire de l'aéronavale canadienne, 1918–1962. Ottawa: Quartier général des forces canadiennes, 1965.

Air service
Canada
History of Canadian military aviation